Julia Cohen was the defending champion, but chose not to participate.

Sharon Fichman won the final against Julia Boserup 6–3, 4–6, 6–4.

Seeds

Draw

Finals

Top half

Bottom half

References
 Main Draw
 Qualifying Draw

WOW Tennis Challenger
Waterloo Challenger